The Tour of Vojvodina was a road cycling race held in Serbia. The race consisted of two one day races. It was part of UCI Europe Tour in category 1.2.

Winners

Tour of Vojvodina I

Tour of Vojvodina II

References

UCI Europe Tour races
Recurring sporting events established in 2006
2006 establishments in Serbia
2012 disestablishments in Serbia
Cycle races in Serbia
Defunct cycling races in Serbia